Dypsis decipiens, the Manambe palm, is a species of flowering plant in the Palm family (Arecaceae). It is found only in the central highlands of Madagascar, between Fianarantsoa and Andilamena at 1,200 to 1,700 meters elevation. The species is threatened by habitat loss, increasing frequency of fires, and over-exploitation of its seeds for the horticultural trade. There can also be three trunks, or a single trunk.

References

decipiens
Endemic flora of Madagascar
Flora of the Madagascar subhumid forests
Vulnerable plants
Taxa named by Odoardo Beccari
Taxonomy articles created by Polbot